Calliostoma hilare is a species of sea snail, a marine gastropod mollusk in the family Calliostomatidae.

Description
The height of the shell attains .

Distribution

References

 Quinn, J. F., Jr. 1992. New species of Calliostoma Swainson, 1840 (Gastropoda: Trochidae), and notes on some poorly known species from the Western Atlantic Ocean. Nautilus 106: 77-114.

External links
 To Biodiversity Heritage Library (1 publication)
 To Encyclopedia of Life
 To USNM Invertebrate Zoology Mollusca Collection
 To World Register of Marine Species

hilare
Gastropods described in 1992